The Pearl Jam 2018 Tour was a concert tour by the American rock band Pearl Jam. The tour consisted of twenty-seven shows, with five in South America, fifteen in Europe and seven in North America. It was the band's first tour following their North American tour that finished in August 2016.

The South American shows took place in March 2018 and were part of the Lollapalooza festival. The band also played their own headlining shows at the Movistar Arena, Chile and the Maracanã Stadium, Brazil. The European shows started at the Ziggo Dome in Amsterdam on June 12 and concluded at the NOS Alive Festival in Lisbon on July 14, 2018. On March 30, 2018, a second show at the Ziggo Dome was announced.

In January 2018, the band announced two shows at Safeco Field in Seattle, billed as the "Home Shows", with proceeds to benefit regional homelessness programs. It was the first time in five years since the band last played in their hometown. Later the same month, five more dates were announced in North America, under the name of the "Away Shows". The band used the show at Washington–Grizzly Stadium in Missoula, Montana to promote their Rock2Vote campaign to encourage young people to vote. Pearl Jam's shows at Wrigley Field and Fenway Park ended up earning $8.1 million and $7.7 million respectively, toping the Billboard Boxscore chart that was dated November 3, 2018.

Tour

South America
Prior to the first shows in South America, Pearl Jam released a new song, "Can't Deny Me", which is taken from their forthcoming album. The tour started on March 13, 2018, with a show at the Movistar Arena in Santiago, Chile. At the opening show of the tour, the band played their new song for the first time, dedicating it to the victims of the Stoneman Douglas High School shooting. They also played the song "Come Back" in memory of Chris Cornell who died the previous year. Pearl Jam's show on March 18, 2018, at the Lollapalooza festival in Argentina, was cancelled due to severe weather. At the final show in South America, in Brazil, Pearl Jam were joined onstage with Perry Farrell, frontman of Jane's Addiction and co-founder of Lollapalooza, to play the Jane's Addiction track "Mountain Song".

Europe
The European tour started with two shows at the Ziggo Dome in Amsterdam, with the band paying tribute to Anthony Bourdain and Chris Cornell. The tour continued with an appearance at the Pinkpop Festival, also in the Netherlands. The next scheduled dates were two sold out nights at the O2 Arena in London, England. However, after playing the first show, Eddie Vedder lost his voice, and the second night was postponed until July 17. It was the first time that the band had postponed a show for this reason. The tour continued, with Pearl Jam playing at the i-Days Festival in Milan, Italy on June 22. They played two further shows in Italy, in Padua and Rome. The show in Rome saw the band cover several songs, including "Comfortably Numb" by Pink Floyd, "Eruption" by Van Halen and "Black Diamond" by Kiss, with drummer Matt Cameron on vocals for the latter.

The European tour continued with several more arena shows, with Pearl Jam covering "Help!" by the Beatles at the gig in Prague, and they were joined onstage with J Mascis of Dinosaur Jr. to cover Neil Young's "Rockin' in the Free World" in Berlin. Following the arena shows, the band played three festival dates: the Werchter Festival in Belgium, the Mad Cool Festival in Spain, and the NOS Alive Festival in Portugal. The European leg concluded on July 17, 2018, with the rescheduled date at London's O2 Arena. The Donald Trump baby balloon was on display outside the venue prior to and during the gig.

North America
The American leg started on August 8, 2018, with a concert at Safeco Field in the band's hometown of Seattle, as part of project across the city to tackle homelessness. At the first show in Seattle, the band covered "We're Going to Be Friends" by the White Stripes. At the second Seattle show, Pearl Jam covered the Chris Cornell song "Missing", which was written for the Singles Soundtrack. The band were also joined onstage with Kim Thayil of Soundgarden, along with Mark Arm and Steve Turner from Mudhoney. The two shows raised more than $11 million to help with homelessness in the city. The next show was at the Washington–Grizzly Stadium in Missoula on August 13, where Pearl Jam promoted the Rock2Vote campaign, to get young people voting. The poster for the gig featured an image of Donald Trump's corpse being pecked at by a bald eagle outside the White House. It drew some controversy, with the Republican candidate for the Senate election in Montana, Matt Rosendale, calling it "disgusting and reprehensible".

The next two dates of the tour were at Wrigley Field, Chicago. At the first night, the band covered "Rebel Rebel" by David Bowie, and were later joined onstage with Dennis Rodman. Writing for the Chicago Sun-Times, Selena Fragassi said that "Pearl Jam shows remain some of the most unpredictable and eclectic live performances". As per the show at Wrigley Field on the 2013 tour, the second night in Chicago suffered a rain delay during Pearl Jam's set. The band were able to return to the stage to complete the show, which included the first ever live performance of the song "Evil Little Goat", an outtake from their debut album Ten.

The tour concluded with two sold-out shows at Fenway Park in Boston. At the first show, the song "Out of My Mind", an outtake from Vitalogy, was played for the first time in nine years. The Boston Herald's Jed Gottlieb said that the band "seemed to pluck sublime rock, unafraid of real emotion from nowhere, and thrill the stadium".

Tour dates

Notes

Band members
Pearl Jam
Jeff Ament – bass guitar
Stone Gossard – rhythm guitar
Mike McCready – lead guitar
Eddie Vedder – lead vocals, guitar
Matt Cameron – drums

Additional musicians
Boom Gaspar – Hammond B3 and keyboards

References

2018 concert tours
Pearl Jam concert tours